The Kingdom of Lesotho is divided into ten districts, each headed by a district administrator. Each district has a capital known as a camptown. The districts are further subdivided into 80 constituencies, which consist of 129 local community councils. Most of the districts are named after their capitals. Hlotse, the capital of Leribe District is also known as Leribe. Conversely, the Berea District is sometimes called Teyateyaneng, based on its capital.

See also
List of districts of Lesotho by Human Development Index
ISO 3166-2:LS

References

Further reading
Census data by administrative division

 
Subdivisions of Lesotho
Lesotho, Districts
Lesotho 1
Districts, Lesotho
Lesotho geography-related lists